The Himachal Pradesh High Court is the High Court of the state of Himachal Pradesh. 	

Himachal Pradesh was born as a result of integration of twenty six  Province and  four  Punjab  hill  States  into  a  Centrally Administered Area on 15 April 1948. The Central Government  promulgated  the  Himachal  Pradesh  (Courts)  Order, 1948 on 15 August 1948.  As per  Paragraph  3  of  this  Order,  the  Court  of  Judicial Commissioner  was  established for Himachal Pradesh and the Court was housed at "Harvingtan" (Kelston area, Bharari, Shimla).  It was vested with the powers of a  High Court under  the  Judicial  Commissioner's  Court  Act,  1950. The Court of Judicial commissioner started functioning on 15 August 1948. The Punjab High Court rules  and  orders  with suitable amendments were made applicable.

In the year 1966, the Delhi High Court Act was enacted by the Government of India and w.e.f.  1 May 1967, the  Central  Government  of  India extended jurisdiction of the said Act to the Union Territory of Himachal Pradesh, replacing the Court of  Judicial Commissioner by the Himachal Bench of Delhi High Court, at Shimla and it started functioning in old High Court building  known  as  "Revenswood". On 18 December 1970, the State of Himachal Pradesh Act was passed by Parliament and the new state came into being on 25 January 1971 and established its own High Court with headquarters at  "Revenswood"  Shimla,  having  one  Hon'ble Chief Justice  and  two  Hon'ble  Judges.

The seat of the court is Shimla, the administrative capital of the state. The court has a sanctioned judge strength of 13 including the chief justice.

The Chief Justice

On 21 January 2023, Sabina took over as the Acting Chief Justice of Himachal Pradesh High Court.

Former Chief Justices

See also
High Courts of India
List of Chief Justices of The Himachal Pradesh High Court

References

External links
 The Himachal Pradesh High Court official website

Government of Himachal Pradesh
1971 establishments in Himachal Pradesh
Courts and tribunals established in 1971